Agent X, in comics, may refer to:

Agent X (Marvel Comics), a fictional mercenary whose adventures have been published by Marvel Comics
Secret Agent X-9, a comic strip begun by writer Dashiell Hammett and artist Alex Raymond

See also
 Agent X (disambiguation)